The 1999–2000 NBA season was the San Antonio Spurs' 24th season in the National Basketball Association, their 27th season as the Spurs, and their 33rd season as a franchise. After having won their first NBA championship in 1999, where they defeated the #8 seed New York Knicks in five games, the Spurs signed free agents Terry Porter, Samaki Walker and Chucky Brown during the off-season. However, prior to the season, Sean Elliott was diagnosed with a kidney disorder, and missed the first four months of the season. He would then receive a kidney transplant from his brother, Noel. The Spurs were originally scheduled to play two games against the Minnesota Timberwolves in Tokyo, Japan in November during the first month of the regular season, but because they won the NBA championship, they were obligated to play in the McDonald's Championship in Milan, Italy in October.

In 1999-2000, the Spurs won 14 of their first 17 games, including a 7-game winning streak. The team held a 32–17 record at the All-Star break, with Tim Duncan and David Robinson both being selected for the 2000 NBA All-Star Game, where Duncan and Shaquille O'Neal of the Los Angeles Lakers were both named co-MVP's. At midseason, Brown was released to free agency and re-signed with the Charlotte Hornets. On March 14, the Spurs' playoff spirits would get a lift when Elliott returned and played in the final 19 games. However, as the season wounded down, Duncan suffered a knee injury, as the Spurs finished second in the Midwest Division with a 53–29 record. Without Duncan, they were eliminated in the Western Conference First Round of the playoffs by the 5th-seeded Phoenix Suns in four games.

Duncan averaged 23.2 points, 12.4 rebounds and 2.2 blocks per game, and was named to the All-NBA First Team, and to the NBA All-Defensive First Team, while Robinson averaged 17.8 points, 9.6 rebounds and 2.3 blocks per game, and was selected to the All-NBA Third Team. In addition, Avery Johnson provided the team with 11.2 points and 6.0 assists per game, while Porter contributed 9.4 points per game off the bench, Mario Elie provided with 7.5 points per game, and Malik Rose averaged 6.7 points and 4.5 rebounds per game off the bench. Duncan also finished in fifth place in Most Valuable Player voting. 

Following the season, Elie signed as a free agent with the Phoenix Suns, and Jerome Kersey signed with the Milwaukee Bucks during the next season.

Draft picks

Roster

Regular season

Season standings

z – clinched division title
y – clinched division title
x – clinched playoff spot

Record vs. opponents

Regular season 

|- bgcolor="#ccffcc"
| 1
| November 2
| Philadelphia
| 
| Tim Duncan (20)
| Tim Duncan (16)
| Avery Johnson (6)
| Alamodome27,288
| 1–0
|- bgcolor="#ccffcc"
| 2
| November 4
| Golden State
| 
| David Robinson (19)
| Tim Duncan (14)
| Terry Porter (6)
| Alamodome14,508
| 2–0
|- bgcolor="#ccffcc"
| 3
| November 5
| @ Houston
| 
| Terry Porter (18)
| David Robinson (11)
| Avery Johnson (9)
| Compaq Center16,285
| 3–0
|- bgcolor="#ffcccc"
| 4
| November 7
| @ Phoenix
| 
| Tim Duncan (15)
| Tim Duncan (17)
| Avery Johnson (6)
| America West Arena19,023
| 3–1
|- bgcolor="#ccffcc"
| 5
| November 9
| @ Golden State
| 
| Malik Rose (21)
| Tim Duncan (11)
| Tim Duncan, Jaren Jackson (5)
| The Arena in Oakland11,601
| 4–1
|- bgcolor="#ccffcc"
| 6
| November 10
| @ L. A. Clippers
| 
| Tim Duncan (22)
| Tim Duncan (17)
| Avery Johnson (6)
| Reunion Arena11,118
| 5–1
|- bgcolor="#ccffcc"
| 7
| November 13
| Charlotte
| 
| Tim Duncan (22)
| Tim Duncan (12)
| Avery Johnson (12)
| Alamodome19,669
| 6–1
|- bgcolor="#ffcccc"
| 8
| November 15
| @ Utah
| 
| Tim Duncan (32)
| David Robinson (10)
| Avery Johnson, Terry Porter (3)
| Alamodome19,584
| 6–2
|- bgcolor="#ccffcc"
| 9
| November 16
| Indiana
| 
| Tim Duncan, David Robinson (22)
| Tim Duncan (15)
| Terry Porter (5)
| Alamodome15,905
| 7–2
|- bgcolor="#ffcccc"
| 10
| November 18
| @ Milwaukee
| 
| Tim Duncan (29)
| Tim Duncan (14)
| Avery Johnson (6)
| Bradley Center15,184
| 7–3
|- bgcolor="#ccffcc"
| 11
| November 20
| Dallas
| 
| Jaren Jackson (23)
| Tim Duncan (17)
| Avery Johnson (8)
| Alamodome16,596
| 8–3
|- bgcolor="#ccffcc"
| 12
| November 22
| @ Philadelphia
| 
| Tim Duncan (26)
| Tim Duncan (17)
| Avery Johnson (6)
| First Union Center16,553
| 9–3
|- bgcolor="#ccffcc"
| 13
| November 24
| @ Boston
| 
| Tim Duncan (31)
| Tim Duncan (15)
| Avery Johnson (9)
| FleetCenter17,426
| 10–3
|- bgcolor="#ccffcc"
| 14
| November 26
| Chicago
| 
| Tim Duncan (23)
| Tim Duncan (10)
| Avery Johnson (5)
| Alamodome24,919
| 11–3
|- bgcolor="#ccffcc"
| 15
| November 27
| Denver
| 
| Malik Rose (21)
| Tim Duncan (17)
| Avery Johnson (8)
| Alamodome22,188
| 12–3
|- bgcolor="#ccffcc"
| 16
| November 30
| Detroit
| 
| Tim Duncan (28)
| Tim Duncan (10)
| Mario Elie (7)
| Alamodome18,328
| 13–3

|- bgcolor="#ccffcc"
| 17
| December 2
| @ New Jersey
| 
| David Robinson (27)
| David Robinson (13)
| Avery Johnson (7)
| Continental Airlines Arena 13,626
| 14–3
|- bgcolor="#ffcccc"
| 18
| December 3
| @ Detroit
| 
| David Robinson (15)
| Tim Duncan (12)
| Avery Johnson (6)
| The Palace of Auburn Hills18,338
| 14–4
|- bgcolor="#ffcccc"
| 19
| December 5
| @ Toronto
| 
| Tim Duncan (27)
| Tim Duncan (13)
| Mario Elie (6)
| Air Canada Centre18,455
| 14–5
|- bgcolor="#ffcccc"
| 20
| December 7
| @ Indiana
| 
| Tim Duncan (30)
| David Robinson (17)
| Tim Duncan, Terry Porter (4)
| Conseco Fieldhouse18,345
| 14–6
|- bgcolor="#ccffcc"
| 21
| December 9
| Vancouver
| 
| Tim Duncan (42)
| Tim Duncan (14)
| Avery Johnson (6)
| Alamodome 14,778
| 15–6
|- bgcolor="#ffcccc"
| 22
| December 11
| Washington
| 
| Tim Duncan (23)
| Tim Duncan (13)
| Avery Johnson (4)
| Alamodome17,187
| 15–7
|- bgcolor="#ccffcc"
| 23
| December 14
| @ Dallas
| 
| Tim Duncan (29)
| Tim Duncan (12)
| Jaren Jackson (7)
| Reunion Arena 13,685
| 16–7
|- bgcolor="#ccffcc"
| 24
| December 15
| Houston
| 
| Tim Duncan (20)
| Tim Duncan (10)
| Terry Porter (5)
| Alamodome23,837
| 17–7
|- bgcolor="#ccffcc"
| 25
| December 17
| Boston
| 
| Tim Duncan (30)
| Tim Duncan (17)
| Avery Johnson (6)
| Alamodome17,264
| 18–7
|- bgcolor="#ffcccc"
| 26
| December 18
| @ Denver
| 
| Tim Duncan (33)
| David Robinson (12)
| Avery Johnson (5)
| Pepsi Center17,318
| 18–8
|- bgcolor="#ccffcc"
| 27
| December 21
| Phoenix
| 
| Tim Duncan (25)
| Tim Duncan (16)
| Avery Johnson (7)
| Alamodome23,480
| 19–8
|- bgcolor="#ffcccc"
| 28
| December 23
| Milwaukee
| 
| Tim Duncan (18)
| Tim Duncan (15)
| Avery Johnson (10)
| Alamodome22,581
| 19–9
|- bgcolor="#ffcccc"
| 29
| December 25
| @ L. A. Lakers
| 
| Tim Duncan (28)
| David Robinson (19)
| Avery Johnson (6)
| STAPLES Center18,997
| 19–10
|- bgcolor="#ccffcc"
| 30
| December 27
| @ Golden State
| 
| David Robinson (28)
| David Robinson (14)
| Avery Johnson (9)
| The Arena in Oakland12,447
| 20–10
|- bgcolor="#ccffcc"
| 31
| December 30
| @ Vancouver
| 
| Tim Duncan (32)
| Tim Duncan (15)
| Tim Duncan (4)
| General Motors Place14,403
| 21–10

|- bgcolor="#ffcccc"
| 32
| January 4 
| @ Minnesota
| 
| Tim Duncan (27)
| Tim Duncan (19)
| Tim Duncan, Avery Johnson (5)
| Target Center15,179
| 21–11
|- bgcolor="#ffcccc"
| 33
| January 5
| Seattle
| 
| Tim Duncan (24)
| Tim Duncan (12)
| Avery Johnson (9)
| Alamodome14,741
| 21–12
|- bgcolor="#ccffcc"
| 34
| January 7 
| @ Phoenix
| 
| David Robinson (24)
| Tim Duncan (15)
| Tim Duncan, Avery Johnson (5)
| America West Arena19,023
| 22–12
|- bgcolor="#ccffcc"
| 35
| January 8 
| Orlando
| 
| Tim Duncan (22)
| David Robinson (13)
| Terry Porter (6)
| Alamodome20,131
| 23–12
|- bgcolor="#ccffcc"
| 36
| January 10
| Utah
| 
| Tim Duncan (46)
| Tim Duncan (14)
| Avery Johnson (6)
| Alamodome17,944
| 24–12
|- bgcolor="#ffcccc"
| 37
| January 13
| @ Sacramento
| 
| Tim Duncan (33)
| Tim Duncan (20)
| Avery Johnson (6)
| ARCO Arena17,317
| 24–13
|- bgcolor="#ffcccc"
| 38
| January 14
| @ Seattle
| 
| Tim Duncan (32)
| Tim Duncan (16)
| Avery Johnson (7)
| KeyArena17,072
| 24–14
|- bgcolor="#ccffcc"
| 39
| January 17
| @ L. A. Clippers
| 
| David Robinson (38)
| Tim Duncan (13)
| Avery Johnson (9)
| STAPLES Center14,264
| 25–14
|- bgcolor="#ffcccc"
| 40
| January 19
| Portland
| 
| David Robinson (29)
| David Robinson (12)
| Terry Porter (7)
| Alamodome20,638
| 25–15
|- bgcolor="#ccffcc"
| 41
| January 22
| New York
| 
| Tim Duncan (33)
| Tim Duncan (15)
| Avery Johnson (6)
| Alamodome34,429
| 26–15
|- bgcolor="#ccffcc"
| 42
| January 25
| L. A. Clippers
| 
| Tim Duncan (24)
| Tim Duncan, David Robinson (13)
| Antonio Daniels, Terry Porter (6)
| Alamodome14,800
| 27–15
|- bgcolor="#ccffcc"
| 43
| January 27
| Minnesota
| 
| Tim Duncan (20)
| Tim Duncan (14)
| Avery Johnson (8)
| Alamodome15,911
| 28–15
|- bgcolor="#ffcccc"
| 44
| January 29
| @ Portland
| 
| Avery Johnson (15)
| David Robinson (10)
| Avery Johnson (5)
| Rose Garden Arena20,584
| 28–16

|- bgcolor="#ccffcc"
| 45
| February 1
| L. A. Lakers
| 
| Tim Duncan (29)
| Tim Duncan (18)
| Avery Johnson (9)
| Alamodome25,589
| 29–16
|- bgcolor="#ccffcc"
| 46
| February 3
| Toronto
| 
| Tim Duncan (32)
| Tim Duncan (17)
| Tim Duncan, Antonio Daniels (7)
| Alamodome19,048
| 30–16
|- bgcolor="#ffcccc"
| 47
| February 6
| @ Utah
| 
| Tim Duncan (32)
| Tim Duncan (10)
| Avery Johnson (6)
| Delta Center18,981
| 30–17
|- bgcolor="#ccffcc"
| 48
| February 8
| Seattle
| 
| Tim Duncan (22)
| David Robinson (11)
| Avery Johnson (5)
| Alamodome16,373
| 31–17
|- bgcolor="#ccffcc"
| 49
| February 9
| @ Denver
| 
| David Robinson (30)
| Tim Duncan (13)
| Avery Johnson (8)
| Pepsi Center16,607
| 32–17
|- align="center"
|colspan="9" bgcolor="#bbcaff"|All-Star Break
|- bgcolor="#ffcccc"
| 50
| February 15
| @ Cleveland
| 
| Tim Duncan (21)
| David Robinson (11)
| Avery Johnson (10)
| Gund Arena15,142
| 32–18
|- bgcolor="#ccffcc"
| 51
| February 18
| Houston
| 
| Tim Duncan (19)
| Tim Duncan (8)
| Avery Johnson (8)
| Alamodome26,846
| 33–18
|- bgcolor="#ccffcc"
| 52
| February 20
| @ Houston
| 
| Tim Duncan (25)
| Tim Duncan (11)
| Avery Johnson (13)
| Compaq Center16,285
| 34–18
|- bgcolor="#ffcccc"
| 53
| February 21
| Phoenix
| 
| David Robinson (31)
| David Robinson (18)
| Terry Porter (7)
| Alamodome17,049
| 34–19
|- bgcolor="#ccffcc"
| 54
| February 24
| @ Charlotte
| 
| David Robinson (16)
| Tim Duncan (12)
| Avery Johnson (7)
| Charlotte Coliseum18,535
| 35–19
|- bgcolor="#ccffcc"
| 55
| February 25
| @ Chicago
| 
| David Robinson (23)
| Malik Rose (11)
| Avery Johnson (5)
| United Center22,879
| 36–19
|- bgcolor="#ffcccc"
| 56
| February 27
| @ Minnesota
| 
| David Robinson (29)
| David Robinson (9)
| Terry Porter (7)
| Target Center19,654
| 36–20
|- bgcolor="#ccffcc"
| 57
| February 29
| Miami
| 
| David Robinson (19)
| Samaki Walker (11)
| Avery Johnson (5)
| Alamodome18,629
| 37–20

|- bgcolor="#ffcccc"
| 58
| March 2
| Minnesota
| 
| David Robinson (24)
| Samaki Walker (12)
| Terry Porter (10)
| Alamodome16,320
| 37–21
|- bgcolor="#ffcccc"
| 59
| March 4
| Sacramento
| 
| David Robinson (23)
| Tim Duncan (15)
| Avery Johnson (8)
| Alamodome35,113
| 37–22
|- bgcolor="#ccffcc"
| 60
| March 6
| New Jersey
| 
| David Robinson (25)
| David Robinson, Tim Duncan (13)
| Avery Johnson (11)
| Alamodome17,581
| 38–22
|- bgcolor="#ccffcc"
| 61
| March 9
| @ Atlanta
| 
| Avery Johnson, Antonio Daniels (18)
| David Robinson (9)
| Antonio Daniels (6)
| Philips Arena12,674
| 39–22
|- bgcolor="#ccffcc"
| 62
| March 10
| @ Washington
| 
| Tim Duncan (23)
| David Robinson (11)
| Avery Johnson, Mario Elie (5)
| MCI Center16,409
| 40–22
|- bgcolor="#ffcccc"
| 63
| March 12
| @ New York
| 
| David Robinson (22)
| Tim Duncan (13)
| Avery Johnson (4)
| Madison Square Garden19,763
| 40–23
|- bgcolor="#ccffcc"
| 64
| March 14
| Atlanta
| 
| David Robinson (26)
| Tim Duncan (13)
| Avery Johnson (10)
| Alamodome26,708
| 41–23
|- bgcolor="#ffcccc"
| 65
| March 16
| Dallas
| 
| David Robinson (20)
| Malik Rose, Mario Elie (7)
| Mario Elie, Samaki Walker, Antonio Daniels, Avery Johnson (3)
| Alamodome23,592
| 41–24
|- bgcolor="#ccffcc"
| 66
| March 18
| Denver
| 
| Samaki Walker (18)
| David Robinson (12)
| Avery Johnson (8)
| Alamodome24,460
| 42–24
|- bgcolor="#ffcccc"
| 67
| March 21
| @ Dallas
| 
| David Robinson (30)
| David Robinson (17)
| Tim Duncan (5)
| Reunion Arena15,578
| 42–25
|- bgcolor="#ccffcc"
| 68
| March 22
| L. A. Clippers
| 
| Tim Duncan (30)
| Samaki Walker (12)
| Antonio Daniels (6)
| Alamodome18,556
| 43–25
|- bgcolor="#ccffcc"
| 69
| March 25
| Cleveland
| 
| Tim Duncan (17)
| Tim Duncan (17)
| Tim Duncan (11)
| Alamodome35,217
| 44–25
|- bgcolor="#ccffcc"
| 70
| March 27
| @ Seattle
| 
| Tim Duncan (30)
| Tim Duncan (18)
| David Robinson, Avery Johnson (5)
| KeyArena14,738
| 45–25
|- bgcolor="#ccffcc"
| 71
| March 28
| @ Portland
| 
| Tim Duncan (36)
| Tim Duncan (15)
| Tim Duncan (6)
| Rose Garden Arena20,584
| 46–25
|- bgcolor="#ccffcc"
| 72
| March 30
| Golden State
| 
| David Robinson (27)
| Tim Duncan (17)
| Jaren Jackson (5)
| Alamodome18,793
| 47–25

|- bgcolor="#ffcccc"
| 73
| April 2
| @ Miami
| 
| David Robinson (28)
| Tim Duncan (11)
| Avery Johnson (6)
| AmericanAirlines Arena19,600
| 47–26
|- bgcolor="#ffcccc"
| 74
| April 4
| @ Orlando
| 
| David Robinson (30)
| Tim Duncan (9)
| Avery Johnson, Antonio Daniels (6)
| TD Waterhouse Centre15,267
| 47–27
|- bgcolor="#ffcccc"
| 75
| April 5
| Sacramento
| 
| Tim Duncan (28)
| David Robinson (8)
| Terry Porter (7)
| Alamodome24,333
| 47–28
|- bgcolor="#ccffcc"
| 76
| April 8
| @ L. A. Lakers
| 
| Tim Duncan (26)
| Tim Duncan (16)
| Terry Porter (6)
| STAPLES Center18,997
| 48–28
|- bgcolor="#ccffcc"
| 77
| April 9
| @ Vancouver
| 
| Tim Duncan (31)
| Tim Duncan (11)
| Avery Johnson (10)
| General Motors Place14,206
| 49–28
|- bgcolor="#ccffcc"
| 78
| April 11
| @ Sacramento
| 
| David Robinson (26)
| David Robinson (14)
| Avery Johnson (6)
| ARCO Arena14,206
| 50–28
|- bgcolor="#ffcccc"
| 79
| April 13
| Portland
| 
| David Robinson (16)
| Samaki Walker (10)
| Avery Johnson (4)
| Alamodome30,641
| 50–29
|- bgcolor="#ccffcc"
| 80
| April 15
| Portland
| 
| David Robinson (19)
| David Robinson (12)
| Avery Johnson (8)
| Alamodome28,114
| 51–29
|- bgcolor="#ccffcc"
| 81
| April 17
| Vancouver
| 
| David Robinson (27)
| David Robinson (10)
| Avery Johnson (7)
| Alamodome19,913
| 52–29
|- bgcolor="#ccffcc"
| 82
| April 19
| L. A. Lakers
| 
| David Robinson (17)
| Malik Rose, Jerome Kersey (9)
| Antonio Daniels (10)
| Alamodome29,447
| 53–29

Playoffs

|- align="center" bgcolor="#ffcccc"
| 1
|  April 22
| Phoenix
| L 70–72
| Sean Elliott (15)
| Samaki Walker (16)
| Elie, Johnson (4)
| Alamodome21,916
| 0–1
|- align="center" bgcolor="#ccffcc"
| 2
| April 25
| Phoenix
| W 85–70
| David Robinson (25)
| David Robinson (15)
| Avery Johnson (6)
| Alamodome20,617
| 1–1
|- align="center" bgcolor="#ffcccc"
| 3
| April 29
| @ Phoenix
| L 94–101
| David Robinson (37)
| David Robinson (13)
| Avery Johnson (6)
| America West Arena19,023
| 1–2
|- align="center" bgcolor="#ffcccc"
| 4
| May 2
| @ Phoenix
| L 78–89
| David Robinson (21)
| David Robinson (16)
| Avery Johnson (5)
| America West Arena19,023
| 1–3
|-

Player statistics

Season

Playoffs

Awards and records
Tim Duncan, All-NBA First Team
David Robinson, All-NBA Third Team
Tim Duncan, NBA All-Defensive First Team

Transactions

References

San Antonio Spurs seasons
San Antonio
San Antonio
San Antonio